The Fauvel AV.36 was a single-seat tailless glider designed in France in the 1950s by Charles Fauvel. Although the "AV" in AV.36 stands for Aile Volante (Flying Wing), it was not a true flying wing: it featured two large fins mounted on stubby tailbooms extending back from the wing's trailing edge, and accommodated the pilot within a stubby fuselage. The aircraft was designed to be quickly disassembled for road transport, with the nose detaching, and the fins able to fold back against the trailing edge of the wing. A refined version with a slightly longer wingspan, the AV.361 was introduced in 1960.

The AV.36 lent itself to easy motorisation, with some builders installing an engine at the rear of the cockpit pod to drive a pusher propeller turning between the tail fins, and the Bölkow factory manufactured some aircraft in this configuration as the AV.36 C11.

Plans for the AV.36 have not been available in France since Fauvel's death in 1979, but  they are still available from  Canadian supplier Falconar Avia of Edmonton, Alberta.

Variants
AV.36
AV.361
AV.36 C11

Specifications (AV.36)

See also

References

Notes

Bibliography
 

1950s French sailplanes
Tailless aircraft
Homebuilt aircraft
Fauvel aircraft
Glider aircraft
Twin-boom aircraft
Motor gliders
Single-engined pusher aircraft
Aircraft first flown in 1951

fr:Charles Fauvel#Fauvel AV 36